Douglas Witter is a fictional character from the WB television drama Dawson's Creek, portrayed by Dylan Neal. The character appears in five of the six seasons, but less frequently in seasons five and six.

Fictional biography

Background
Doug Witter is the older brother of main character Pacey Witter. He is a local police officer, and was introduced in the first season of the show. He is shown to be judgmental of his younger brother. Doug became a police officer to be close to their father, who is the sheriff, and does everything he can to get on his father's good side. Doug is judgmental of Pacey's laid-back and care-free attitude, sometimes belittling his younger brother who is mistreated and neglected by their alcoholic and frequently abusive father who favors Doug more because Doug is subservient and often follows their stern father's orders and abrasive comments without question as well as calmly takes any of Mr. Witter's verbal and physical abuse. Pacey, believing Doug to be a homosexual in denial, spends most of the series persuading Doug to "come out of the closet", which Doug strongly denies being in. During the run of the show, he progresses professionally, and eventually becomes the Chief of Police in Capeside. He lives on his own in a small apartment, but occasionally allows family members to stay with him. He is obsessively neat, and expects that the people in his life follow his lead.

Season 1
During season one, Doug's main interactions are with Pacey. Doug is seen to form a crush on a Capeside High School English teacher, Tamara Jacobs, who, unbeknownst to Doug, is already involved in a sexual relationship with Pacey. As Pacey is only 15 and one of Miss Jacobs students, the relationship is kept quiet. Later in the season, when the affair is exposed, Doug immediately assumes Pacey has made up a rumour and is lying about any association that he has with his teacher, who Doug describes as "poor, sweet Tamara". When Pacey tells the board of governors that he was lying, Doug apologises to Tamara for his brother's behaviour. Tamara in turn chastises Doug for his words, and defends Pacey, leaving Doug perplexed. During the season, Pacey makes jokes about Doug's sexuality, even briefly duping Miss Jacobs into believing he is openly gay, an act for which Doug threatens Pacey with his gun.

Season 2
Doug is mentioned but he does not appear at all in season two, since the actor was committed to another series at the time.

Season 3
During season three, Doug becomes marginally involved in the storyline involving the seductive but manipulative Eve Whitman. Firstly, Dawson Leery calls him to the scene of a burglary at Evelyn Ryan's house, but fails to tell Doug that the perpetrator is Eve (after she had threatened Dawson that she will implicate him in the break-in if he ratted her out). During the same episode, Dawson solicits Doug's advice about tracking Eve down after she has disappeared. Dawson and Pacey trail Eve onto a yacht that she has been illegally living on, but being slick and devious, Eve gives them both the slip and makes an anonymous phone call to the police where Doug arrives and catches both Dawson and Pacey on board the boat, threatening to arrest them for trespassing.

Doug and Pacey banter for a while, with Pacey implying that Doug is sexually interested in Dawson, Doug shouts back to Pacey that he is not gay.

In an episode entitled "The Longest Day", Doug attends the christening of Pacey's boat, and is displeased to find himself suddenly babysitting Pacey's young friend Buzz (who the younger Witter is mentoring). In one episode ("The Valentine's Day Massacre"), Doug ends up arresting Pacey and five of his friends (Joey Potter, Dawson, Jack and Andie McPhee, and their visiting friend, Kate Douglas) and placing them in the 'drunk tank' at the police station after a party. Towards the end of the season, Pacey moves in with Doug after their older sister, Kerry, and her three children move into their parents home after leaving her abusive husband, and thus Pacey finds himself more or less thrown out onto the street. (Note: alcoholism and domestic abuse appears to be a pattern among nearly all of the male relatives and in-laws of the Witter family... excluding Doug and Pacey.) During their brief living together status, Doug inadvertently ends up advising Pacey on his relationship with Joey. Pacey remarks that the advice is "thought out and un-Dougy like", before attempting to put it into practice.

Season 4
At the beginning of season four, Doug rejects Pacey's pleadings to return to live with him, as he is now playing host to their other older sister Gretchen (Sasha Alexander) who is taking time out from her university studies. Gretchen soon becomes irritated by Doug's obsessive cleaning, remarking that living with him is "like living with Felix Unger on crack". She soon moves out of Doug's apartment shortly thereafter to live with Pacey in a summer beach house that Gretchen rents.

In a later episode, Doug's job is ridiculed by Pacey, who makes fun of the trivial aspects of small town police work. The brothers later make up, showing a rarely seen closeness.

Midway through the season, Doug attends Pacey's 18th birthday party, telling the assembled friends and his immature and cynical family members about a time that Pacey wet himself, laughing at the memory which further humiliates Pacey.

Later in the season, during senior ditch day, Doug arrests Pacey that evening for drunk and disorderly conduct after skipping school and causing a public disturbance with Dru Valentine. Doug threatens to arrest Pacey and further browbeats him by adding: "Haven't you embarrassed and shamed this family enough? You're not satisfied with being a moron and a failure, now you've got to add 'drunk' to your list credentials?" With that, Pacey loses it and grabs Doug and screams: "This is it for me, Doug! This is my life now! This is all I get!" Doug instead drives Pacey home and shows that he still is a good brother by agreeing to drop the charges.

A short time later, Doug attempts to help Pacey with his schoolwork, after their stern father, John (John Finn), receives a telephone call from the school saying that Pacey is in trouble academically. Pacey rejects the offer of help, but he nevertheless graduates, with Doug telling him that he is proud of him, agreeing to him storing his belongings at his flat while Pacey goes sailing for the summer.

Season 5
Doug appears only briefly during season five, as almost all main characters (including Pacey) are now living in Boston, and the action is focused there. At the beginning of the season, Doug recommends Pacey for a restaurant job with his friend, Danny Brecher. A few episodes later, Doug repeatedly attempts to contact Pacey to tell him that Mitch Leery, Dawson's father, has died, but Pacey ignores his calls, only discovering the reason for Doug's persistence when Joey visits him in person.

Season 6
In season six, Doug and Pacey's dynamic changes, as Pacey gets a good job with excellent pay at a small stockbroker firm in Boston. Pacey returns home to Capeside for Christmas with expensive gifts for the family, including a gold wristwatch for Doug. Apparently disbelieving that his slacker brother could make large sums of money through legitimate means, Doug questions Pacey on how he was able to afford such presents. Doug later attends Christmas dinner at the Leery house, hosted by Dawson's mother Gail, during which has a very drunk Audrey Liddell crashes Pacey's car into the side of the house. Doug ends up covering up for her legally, on the condition that Pacey covers the cost of the damages.

When Doug's father has a heart attack, new rivalries between the Witter brothers rise to the surface. Pacey, who now earns far more money than Doug, arranges for their father to have a private room at the hospital, and is heavily praised by their father, who brags about his youngest son to the doctors and nurses. For the first time in his life, Doug becomes upset at the lack of attention he receives from their father, thus getting a taste of the paternal neglect and mistreatment Pacey went through his entire childhood, and Doug gets more upset with Pacey because of this. When John begins to thank Pacey for paying for his hospital room, Pacey lies, telling him that Doug arranged it. Doug does not tell his father the truth, instead accepting the kudos that were due to Pacey. Though John Witter survives his heart attack, he apparently became too sick to work anymore because of multiple health problems caused by his lifelong alcoholism. As a result, Doug became the acting police chief of Capeside, and later full-time police chief.

Towards the end of the season, Pacey has financial difficulties which result in him losing his job and losing all his money, after which he is forced to move in with Doug, back in Capeside. Later, while Dawson is making another film, Doug (as the acting police chief) helps by blocking traffic from the street and volunteering with security on the movie set.

Series finale
Doug features in the finale, set five years in the future, quite heavily. His first appearance is when he pulls Jack McPhee over for speeding on his way to work. He give him stern words of warning about his driving, but then moves in to kiss him, confirming that the two are in a relationship. Since Doug and Pacey's father either died or became too sick to work, Doug is now the police chief of Capeside. Doug later turns up at the reopened Ice House restaurant, now owned by Pacey (with help from the bank and several Witter family members). He eats breakfast with Pacey.

Midway through the episode, Doug goes jogging with Jack, and a conversation between the two exposes flaws in their relationship, namely Doug's unwillingness to publicly reveal his sexuality, and Jack's unwillingness to live his life behind closed doors. The couple split shortly afterwards, but it is clear both still care about the other.

When Jen Lindley, Jack's best friend, becomes gravely ill, Doug goes to the hospital to show support for his former partner. After Jen's funeral, Doug attends the wake and tries to comfort Jack. Jack initially pushes him away, but Doug makes it clear that he wants to be with him and his daughter, as Jack has taken custody of Jen's daughter Amy. Doug kisses Jack on the beach while they are caring for Amy, and calls out to an elderly couple walking nearby, telling them he is in a relationship with Jack.

Dawson's Creek characters
Witter, Doug
Fictional LGBT characters in television
Fictional police officers